Kazimierz Wierzyński (Drohobycz, Kingdom of Galicia and Lodomeria, 27 August 1894 – 13 February 1969, London) was a Polish poet and journalist; an elected member of the prestigious Polish Academy of Literature in the Second Polish Republic.

Life
Kazimierz Wierzyński was born in Drohobycz (Drohobych), Kingdom of Galicia and Lodomeria. He was a co-founder, with Julian Tuwim and three other poets, of the Skamander group of experimental poets. His work Olympic Laurel (Polish: Laur olimpijski, 1927), which idealizes the grace and fitness of athletes, won the gold medal for poetry at the 1928 Olympic Games in Amsterdam, and his other early poems also celebrate the joy of living.

In September 1939, after the invasion of Poland by Nazi Germany, Wierzyński and his wife Helena escaped from Poland and, via  Romania, Yugoslavia, Italy, and France, eventually reached the USA, where they stayed for almost twenty years.

His later works, written in exile, are more somber and socially conscious. The Bitter Crop (1933) includes poems about the United States. His Forgotten Battlefield (1944) contains narratives of World War II. He died in London, England.

See also
 List of Poles

References

External links 
 Profile of Kazimierz Wierzyński at Culture.pl

1894 births
1969 deaths
Burials at Powązki Cemetery
People from Drohobych
Polish Austro-Hungarians
Polish male writers
Polish Rifle Squads members
Polish Military Organisation members
Polish legionnaires (World War I)
Olympic gold medalists in art competitions
Members of the Polish Academy of Literature
Golden Laurel of the Polish Academy of Literature
20th-century Polish poets
Medalists at the 1928 Summer Olympics
20th-century male writers
Olympic competitors in art competitions
People associated with the magazine "Kultura"